Craig Gibson is an American college baseball coach and former first baseman. He is the head baseball coach at Mercer University since the start of the 2004 season. Under Gibson, Mercer has appeared in its first two NCAA Tournaments. A Macon native, Gibson is a Mercer alumnus and played baseball for the Bears from 1983–1986, winning a conference player of the year award as a junior.

Coaching career
After he completed his playing career and undergraduate degree at Mercer in 1986, Gibson spent the next two seasons as an assistant coach at Mercer while earning his graduate degree.  He left after the 1988 season and spent the next six years as a high school coach in South Florida.  He returned to Mercer as an assistant for the 1994 season.

After a ten-year stint as a Mercer assistant in the late 1990s and early 2000s, Gibson succeeded Barry Myers as the Bears' head coach for the start of the 2004 season.  For his first two seasons, Link Jarrett, who would later coach against Gibson in the Southern Conference as UNC Greensboro, served as one of Gibson's assistants.  The Bears made their first postseason appearance under Gibson in 2006, when they finished 3rd in the Atlantic Sun Conference (A-Sun) to qualify for the A-Sun Tournament.  As the second seed (second-place North Florida was ineligible), Mercer went 2–2.  They defeated East Tennessee State in the opening game, then lost to Stetson, 6–5 in extra innings, in their second.  In the losers bracket, the Bears knocked out top-seeded Jacksonville, before being eliminated with another one-run loss to Stetson.

Mercer made three more A-Sun Tournament appearances from 2007–2009 before reaching its first NCAA Tournament in 2010.  At the A-Sun Tournament, Gibson's team went 4–0 to win the conference's automatic bid, defeating East Tennessee State and Jacksonville two times each.  Gibson, said of the win, "It’s an unbelievable feeling to win here and to be going to the NCAA Tournament. It’s about those 27 guys that care for each other, love each other and play hard for each other. It’s the best group I’ve had, as far as chemistry goes. I’m really proud of them."  As the third seed in the Atlanta Regional, Mercer went 1–2.  They were shut out by Georgia Tech in the opener, then defeated Elon before being eliminated by Alabama.  The Bears returned to the NCAA Tournament in 2013 and went 0–2 in the Starkville Regional.  Gibson was named the 2013 A-Sun Coach of the Year, and Kendall Rogers of Perfect Game named him a rising college coach after the season.

Gibson's players have received many individual honors during his tenure, including major conference awards. Third baseman Chesny Young was named A-Sun Rookie of the Year in 2012 and Player of the Year in 2013.  Shortstop Michael Massi was the 2014 Defensive Player of the Year. Between 2004–2014, 14 Mercer players were taken in the Major League Baseball Draft. Cory Gearrin, taken in the fourth round in 2007 Major League Baseball Draft, played for the Atlanta Braves from 2011–2013.

Head coaching record
Below is a table of Gibson's yearly records as a collegiate head baseball coach.

See also
List of current NCAA Division I baseball coaches
Mercer Bears

References

External links
2014 Interview with Gibson at Macon.com

1960s births
Living people
Sportspeople from Macon, Georgia
Mercer Bears baseball players
Mercer Bears baseball coaches
Baseball coaches from Georgia (U.S. state)